Wall Street Methodist Episcopal Church, formerly the home of the African Methodist Episcopal Zion Church, was a historic Methodist Episcopal church located at 69 Wall Street in Auburn, New York, United States. It was a large Gothic Revival style brick and limestone structure built in 1788, and renovated in the 1887.  Following years of neglect, it was damaged in a windstorm in the summer of 2021 and demolished.
The facade was dominated by a square tower topped by a broach spire.  It was an example of an auditorium plan church, popular in church design from the 1880s to 1920s.

The church was listed on the National Register of Historic Places in 1999.

See also
National Register of Historic Places listings in Cayuga County, New York

References

External links

Churches on the National Register of Historic Places in New York (state)
Methodist churches in New York City
Gothic Revival church buildings in New York City
Churches completed in 1887
19th-century Methodist church buildings in the United States
Churches in Cayuga County, New York
Akron Plan church buildings
National Register of Historic Places in Cayuga County, New York
Buildings and structures in Auburn, New York